Viqueque Airport  serves Viqueque, East Timor.

External links
 

Airports in East Timor
Viqueque Municipality